Darryl Henriques is an author, satirist, stand-up comedian, and actor on stage and radio, and in TV and film.

Career 
Henriques, a Cheese Board Collective worker, coined the phrase Gourmet Ghetto.

Darryl Henriques joined the San Francisco Mime Troupe in 1967, later El Teatro Campesino, the East Bay Sharks (street theater) and the Bread and Puppet Theater.

KSAN (1968 to 1980) Scoop Nisker's Last News Show news comedy characters included: Joe Carcinogenni, Rattus Rat, Jacques Kissmatoe, Rev. Clyde Fingerdip and The Swami From Miami. VIDEOWEST cable access show was hosted by Scoop Nisker with Henriques, Laura Daltry, Joe Lerer, and Jane Dornacker.

He appeared in FTA Show, Star Trek: The Next Generation, Star Trek VI, Jumanji (1995) and the Star Wars franchise.

On October 27, 1936, the play It Can't Happen Here opened in 22 theaters in 18 cities across the USA. Henriques initiated the 2011 national readings, mostly on Monday, October 24, co-sponsored by the San Francisco Mime Troupe and Dell'Arte International School of Physical Theatre in Blue Lake, California.

Personal life 
Henriques left the San Francisco Bay Area for the Los Angeles area in 1984.

Filmography

Bibliography

See also 
 The Unborn 2
 Citizen: I'm Not Losing My Mind, I'm Giving It Away
 Gourmet Ghetto
 Suspicion Song
 Ray's Male Heterosexual Dance Hall
 Wicket W. Warrick
 The Last Outpost (Star Trek: The Next Generation)
 San Francisco Comedy Competition
 Live Shot
 William Farley (director)
 Caravan of Courage: An Ewok Adventure
 Villa Alegre (TV series)
 Paul Krassner
 Warwick Davis filmography
 Alice Kahn
 List of Star Trek characters (N–S)
 FTA Show
 Joe Carcione

References

External links 
 

American stand-up comedians
People from California